The OD 82 / SE is a hand grenade, currently issued to the Italian Army.

History 
In the 1970s and 1980s it became necessary to replace the SRCM Mod. 35, which dated back to World War II. A first model of the new grenade, the OD / 82-HE with its training version OD / 82-E-1, was produced by the company "La Precisa S.p.A." Teano.

Adopted by the Army, production was immediately interrupted after numerous incidents (some fatal) of premature detonation. The grenade was then modified by the Italian's army "Stabilimento Militare di Munizionamento Terrestre" (S.M.M.T.) of Baiano di Spoleto and was adopted by the armed forces as OD 82 / SE; The OD acronym stands for Offense / Defense; 82 refers to 1982, the year of production of the first model; the abbreviation SE added after Arsenal changes, derives from High Safety in Italian Sicurezza Elevata.
The production of OD / 82 at the arsenal was interrupted due to the explosion of the "riservetta 73" of the same SMMT, which took place on 10 April 2005, where were stored the OD / 82 still to be edited.

The replacement began in 2013 of OD / 82 with MF-2000, produced at the factory of Terrestrial Military Ammunition Baiano di Spoleto; its activation system is realized by SACIL srl of Pratissolo of Scandiano near Reggio Emlia.

Features 
The OD 82 / SE is controlled fragmentation hand grenade, unique offensive and defensive type, in time pirico delay. The safety distance is 20 metres, and effective distance at 5 metres 85%. The bomb body is khaki with a yellow line. A training model OD 82-E-1 is blue with brown line.

Notes

See also 
 SRCM Mod. 35

Grenades of Italy